Arif Yousaf is a Pakistani politician hailing from Peshawar, who served as a member in the 10th Khyber Pakhtunkhwa Assembly, belonging to the Pakistan Tehreek-e-Insaf.

Political career
Yousaf was elected as the member of the Khyber Pakhtunkhwa Assembly on ticket of Pakistan Tehreek-e-Insaf from PK-04 (Peshawar-IV) in 2013 Pakistani general election.

References

Living people
Pashtun people
Khyber Pakhtunkhwa MPAs 2013–2018
People from Peshawar
Pakistan Tehreek-e-Insaf politicians
Year of birth missing (living people)